Sleeping Tapes is a 2015 spoken word/ambient album by actor Jeff Bridges, with music by Keefus Ciancia.

The album was released by web hosting service Squarespace as part of its 2015 Super Bowl advertising campaign, with all proceeds from album sales going to Share Our Strength's No Kid Hungry campaign.

Reception 

Pitchfork gave the album 7.8 out of a possible 10, noting, "Way beyond sleep aids, you get the sense that Bridges would be a hell of a life coach."

Track listing

References

External links 
 

2015 albums
Jeff Bridges albums
Ambient albums by American artists
Sponsored albums
Spoken word albums by American artists
2010s spoken word albums